Angelica Morrone di Silvestri (born 25 November 1965) is a cross-country skier who competed for Dominica at the 2014 Winter Olympics in the cross-country skiing race.

She and her husband Gary di Silvestri earned points by competing in qualifying races in lower level tournaments in New Zealand and North America. She finished at or near the bottom in many qualifying races, but earned enough points to qualify for the Olympics. She was injured in a training run and did not compete in the 10K women's classic on 13 February. The Di Silvestris were accused in 2014 of evading paying taxes on the sale of their Turks and Caicos mansion in 2006, but were never indicted.

See also
Dominica at the 2014 Winter Olympics

References

1965 births
Living people
Dominica female cross-country skiers
Cross-country skiers at the 2014 Winter Olympics
Dominica people of Italian descent
People of Calabrian descent
Olympic cross-country skiers of Dominica
Sportspeople from Cosenza